Dato' (Dr) Vinod Sekhar is the Chairman and Chief Executive of the PETRA Group, which is a global conglomerate involved in sustainable industries, with one common goal of providing solutions for humanity. PETRA Group’s businesses range from  aerospace, arms, defense, information security, airline, energy, petrochemicals, natural gas, banking, cryptocurrency, medical, artificial intelligence, gaming, telecommunication, plantations, biotechnology, e-commerce, education, information technology, satellite communication, semiconductor, shipping,  manufacturing, modular building construction, green rubber technology, rail transit systems, agriculture, media, entertainment, lifestyle, and research and advocacy.

As an advocate for social capitalism, Sekhar believes that business interests and society concerns should go hand in hand, which acts as the basis of the PETRA Group. He believes that enterprises should be run as profitable ventures while doing the right thing for employees, customers, society and the environment, to ensure sustainable wealth creation and equitable income generation for all.

He is the founder of the Vinod Sekhar Foundation that undertakes various initiatives to alleviate poverty, provide healthcare and education, and support the most vulnerable communities including the indigenous, disabled, old folks, children, refugees, and poor.

He was named by Forbes magazine as Malaysia's 28th richest man in 2009.

The title of Dato' was given to Sekhar at the age of 26 by Yang di Pertuan Besar of Negeri Sembilan, Tuanku Ja'afar on his 71st birthday, who was at that time the 10th Yang di Pertuan Agong of Malaysia.

Personal life
Sekhar is the youngest son of Sukumari Nair and B.C. Sekhar, also known as Mr. Natural Rubber, who for a time provided significant inputs in the global natural rubber industry. He has three siblings. He is married to Winy Sekhar with whom he has two daughters, Petra and Tara.

He has written numerous plays and even produced a book of poetry. "In the Mind's Eye", one of the plays that he has written was a success and was well received when it was produced in the United States, United Kingdom and in his homeland, Malaysia.

He also enjoys playing golf with a 22 handicap.

Education
He attended Haileybury and Imperial Service College He started a non-partisan multiracial youth organisation, Malaysian Muda. He remained president for two terms.

Businesses 
Sekhar was only 21 when he started his business career with just US$50 when he put up his own clothing company called Vincent Siefer Clothing Company that sold college embossed shirts to university students in different American universities. He later then sold his clothing company for US$5 million.

In 1990, Sekhar formed Sekhar Tunku Imran (STI) Group together with his friend, Tunku Tan Sri Imran and penetrated various business ventures. Some of the most notable business deals that STI had was when it had a joint venture with Disney-MGM Studios in Florida, USA to produce the movie entitled Tarzan, The Epic Adventure.

The Petra Group is a privately held company that is known for Green Rubber Global, the company's key business which is a cost-effective process that can efficiently recycle used rubber. In 2019, it was reported that an Irish national, John Slattery sued Sekhar to claim the US$108,000 which he had paid the businessperson in 2017 as an investment into Green Rubber Sdn Bhd. In 2021, Petra Group claimed to have procured 400 million Sinovac vaccines from China for free distribution. Malaysian government dismissed the claim and found no evidence for its basis.

Sekhar is also an active supporter of different socio-civic organisations. He founded the Sekhar Foundation which owns 80% of The Petra Group and acts as the philanthropic arm of the company by supporting various charitable organisations worldwide. The Sekhar Foundation has donated to a range of Non Government Organisations (NGO) that are working in the fields of education, poverty alleviation, and healthcare provision.

Achievements, Awards and Honours

Sekhar was also one of the first Malaysians to venture into the former Soviet Union after its breakup and was a part of the privatization of its second largest petrochemical plant. He was also the first Southeast Asian to own both Formula 2000 and Formula 3 Championship motorsports teams, and he founded Malaysia’s first sports car company.

Sekhar has presented a variety of papers at and participated in many international conferences including the International Human Rights Conference in Brussels, the first Malaysian International Youth Conference for Unity in Kuala Lumpur, the Asia Europe Young Leaders Conference in Ireland, the New Asian Leaders Retreat in Seoul, South Korea programmer for the World Economic Forum, the WEF's Davos Annual meeting, he was the Chair of the first New Asian Leaders–Emerging Arab Leaders Summit in Langkawi, which was attended by King Abdullah II of Jordan, and he was a speaker at the 2005 Forbes Global CEO Conference in Sydney. 

He is the Chairman of the Vinod Sekhar Foundation (which he founded and which currently plays a role in the lives of over 120 million children globally), the Chairman of the Pelita Harapan (Lantern of Hope) for terminally ill children, the Co-Chairman of the Innocent Child Appeal Fund Board for abused children, and the Chairman of the Sitavani Foundation. He was also the founding President of Malaysian Muda, the first nonpartisan multiracial national youth organization created to develop unity among Malaysian youth, where he warned of polarization among young Malaysians two decades before the government finally acknowledged it was out of control. 

In 1991, he was made the first and youngest Asian fellow of Kappa Delta Pi, a US-based international Honors Society for Education for his contribution to the globalization of education.  The organization awarded its "The Point of Excellence" award to his company, the first Asian company to be so honored. Sekhar was 26 years old and one of the youngest to be so honored. The World Economic Forum named him as one of its 40 "New Asian Leaders" (NAL). Grant Thornton named him the Malaysian Corporate Leader of the Year in August 2008. 

In September 2020, Sekhar launched The Vibes, an online news publication covering Malaysian news. The news publication is spearheaded by Terence Fernandez, former managing editor of Malay Mail, alongside many former journalists from major publications.

Literary and film works 
He has written several plays and a book of poetry. One of his plays, In the Mind’s Eye, was produced with success in the US, UK and Malaysia. Sekhar also hosted Malaysia's first English language talk show on television. 

In 2013, Sekhar produced the Indian film Liar's Dice which features the story of Kamala, a young woman from Chitkul village and her girl child Manya, who embarks on a journey leaving their native land in search for her missing husband. He has also launched the production company Petra Films which produces the Golden Horse Award-nominated film The Sunny Side of the Street in its debut outing.

References

External links
 Mel Gibson, the English Earl and the Malaysian entrepreneur – The Daily Telegraph UK, 29 August 2007
Petra plays its part in conservation, The Star, 29 August 2007.
 Vinod named Corporate Leader of the Year- The star, 16 July 2008
 Asian tycoon donates 8m to help fund world-leading medical centre The Scotsman, 22 February 2008
 Sekhar – Addressing economic needs vital to fight graft – The Edge Daily, 20 June 2008
 Vinod Sekhar Incubation Centre launched in Uni of Nottingham Malaysia Campus The Star Malaysia, 20 November 2016

1968 births
Malaysian businesspeople
Malaysian people of Indian descent
Businesspeople of Indian descent
Living people